Naidu (Nayudu/Nayadu/Naidoo/Nayakudu) is a title used by some South Indian Telugu communities, Telugu people such as the Balija, Golla, Kamma, Kapu, Gavara, Telaga, Turupu Kapu, Ekila Kapu(Pala Ekari), Velama, Boya and Yadava Naidu.

Notable people
People bearing the title Naidu include:

 Ama Naidoo, social activist, South Africa
 Baddukonda Appala Naidu, YSRCP leader
 B. Munuswamy Naidu,Former Chief Minister of Madras Presidency
 Chota K. Naidu, Telugu cinematographer
 C. K. Nayudu, India's first cricket captain
 D. K. Adikesavulu Naidu, former Chairman of Tirumala Tirupati Devasthanams, former member of the Indian National Congress
 Dwaram Venkataswamy Naidu, Carnatic violinist
 Daggubati Ramanaidu, Telugu film producer
 Gali Muddu Krishnama Naidu, member of Telugu Desam Party
 Galla Ramachandra Naidu, Indian industrialist, the founder of Amara Raja Group of companies
 Gorle Sriramulu Naidu, former Minister, INC, AP
Grandhi Venkata Reddy Naidu, first Law Minister, AP
 G. D. Naidu, scientist, inventor and businessman, known as "Edison of India"
 Jayapa Nayudu, commander from Kammanadu and brother-in-law of Kakatiya king Ganapathi Deva
 Kodi Rammurthy Naidu, Indian nationalist and body builder
 Kondapalli Pydithalli Naidu, TDP former MP
 Kondapalli Appala Naidu, Telugu Desam Party leader
 Kurma Venkata Reddy Naidu, Former Chief Minister of Madras Presidency
 K. Venkataswami Naidu, politician
 Leela Naidu, Indian actress
 M. Venkaiah Naidu, 13th Vice President of India
 Nalla Reddi Naidu, former MP
 Naransamy Roy Naidoo, social activist in South Africa
 Nimmala Rama Naidu, politician, TDP 
 N. Chandrababu Naidu,Former Chief Minister of Andhra Pradesh, leader of Telugu Desam Party
 P. Varadarajulu Naidu, Indian physician, politician, journalist and Indian independence activist
 P. V. Rangaiah Naidu Indian Police Service as a Director General of Police and member of the 10th Lok Sabha of India
 Padmaja Naidu, freedom fighter
 Palnati Brahmanaidu, minister of a small Andhra kingdom of Palnadu (part of present Guntur district
 Pathivada Narayanaswamy Naidu Former Minister, TDP, AP
 Pemmasani Ramalinga Nayudu, Chief-Commander of Sri Krishna Deva Raya and a Pemmasani Nayak
 Raghupathi Venkaiah Naidu, "father of Telugu film industry", film director and producer
 Raghupathi Venkataratnam Naidu, Indian social reformer
 Sarojini Naidu, "nightingale of India" and wife of Dr. Govindarajula Naidu
 Shobha Naidu, classical dancer
 Srihari S. Naidu, physician
 Thota Narasaiah Naidu, freedom fighter
 Vasireddy Venkatadri Nayudu, Amaravathi Raja

References

Lists of people by surname